Panipat Taraf Ansar is a census town in Panipat district in the Indian state of Haryana.

Demographics
 India census, Panipat Taraf Ansar had a population of 31,204. Males constitute 55% of the population and females 45%. Panipat Taraf Ansar has an average literacy rate of 58%, lower than the national average of 59.5%: male literacy is 65%, and female literacy is 50%. In Panipat Taraf Ansar, 16% of the population is under 6 years of age.

References

Cities and towns in Panipat district